Mercury hydride may refer to:

Mercury(I) hydride (HgH or Hg2H2), an extremely unstable gas
Mercury(II) hydride (HgH2), a volatile, relatively stable white solid